The Public Transport Centre (formerly known as the Westrail Centre) is a terminal and administration building for public transport in Perth, Western Australia. It is the centerpiece of East Perth Terminal (formerly known as Perth Terminal), a standard gauge railway station and coach terminal adjacent to East Perth station on the Transperth narrow gauge suburban rail network.

Previous use

The site occupied by East Perth station, East Perth Terminal, and the Public Transport Centre was formerly the East Perth Locomotive Depot.

East Perth Railway Terminal

As part of the gauge conversion of the Eastern Goldfields Railway, a new standard gauge terminus was opened in 1969. The station has one side platform and a dock platform at its northern end.

Today the station is served by Journey Beyond's Indian Pacific, and Transwa's Prospector and MerredinLink services. Until it ceased in June 1991, the terminal was also served by the Trans-Australian.

Administration building
The construction of building above and adjacent to the Railway Terminal platform was commissioned by the Western Australian Government Railways (WAGR). By the time it was completed, WAGR had become Westrail.

It was opened by State Premier Charles Court 12 November 1976 as the Westrail Centre. The public area includes a newsagent, café, help desks, vending machines, seats, televisions, information screens, an ATM and public toilets.

The building was formerly the headquarters for Westrail, and after the sale of Westrail's freight services was occupied by the Australian Railroad Group (ARG) from 2000 until 2002. In 2002, ARG relocated to Welshpool, and the building is now occupied by the Public Transport Authority and Department of Transport having been renamed the Public Transport Centre.

In 2000, the upper floors were refurbished. Transwa coach services to various state destinations also currently depart and arrive at the northern end of the terminal building.

References

External links
Gallery of Perth Terminal Station in 1969 before construction of the Public Transport Centre

Brutalist architecture in Australia
Buildings and structures in Perth, Western Australia
East Perth, Western Australia
Government buildings completed in 1976
Railway stations in Perth, Western Australia
Railway stations in Australia opened in 1976